Marcus Ahlm (born 7 July 1978) is a Swedish handballer. He retired from handball in 2013 after playing for German Handball-Bundesliga team THW Kiel.

Career

In his youth, Marcus Ahlm played for the IFK Kristianstad Handball team and then later moved to IFK Ystad HK. In 2003 he transferred to the team THW Kiel and impressed enough to become one of their most important players in 2004/05. In that season he worked with Nikola Karabatic, a centre back who ranked among the best players in German handball. After the 2012/13 season Ahlm ended his career. He was considered one of the best circle runners in the world and was often compared to Magnus Wislander. In 2005 he was voted the Swedish Player of the Year. With THW Kiel, Ahlm won the German Championship eight times and the Champions League three times.

In 1999, Marcus Ahlm took part in the Junior World Championships, in which Sweden won silver. In 2001 he played for the Swedish national team for the first time. One year later he won the European Championship on home soil. For the World Qualifiers in 2005, Ahlm was intended to play as a circle runner, but an injury prevented him from participating in games against Turkey, Belgium and Belarus. Instead, he was replaced by Pelle Linders. He had 114 international caps and 367 goals scored in total by the end of his career.

At the end of his active career Alhm became a member of the board for THW Kiel.

Private life

Marcus Ahlm studies chemistry, and is married with a son (Henry)and two daughters (Alice and ines).

Achievements 

 German Champions in 2005, 2006, 2007, 2008, 2009, 2010, 2012 and 2013 with THW Kiel
 DHB Cup winner in 2007, 2008, 2009, 2011, 2012 and 2013
 DHB-Supercup winner in 2005, 2007, 2008, 2011 and 2012
 2nd place at the Scandinavian Open 2006
 Champions League winner in 2007, 2010 and 2012
 Super Globe Winner 2011
 EHF Champions Trophy 2007 winner
 EHF Winners Cup  2004
 European Champion 2002
 Silver at the 1999 Junior World Championships
 Sweden's Player of the Year in 2005
 National team Supercup winner in 2005

Honours 
 3rd place in Handballwoche's "Player of the Year" vote in 2005.
  Handball magazine ranking: Council: 1. 2005 (WK), 3. 2004 (IK)
 In the Handballwoche team of the Season in 2003/2004, 2004/2005 und 2005/2006
 Schleswig-Holstein medal for sport 2011

Career in Bundesliga

References

External links 
Profile 

1978 births
Living people
Swedish male handball players
IFK Kristianstad players